Rika Fujiwara and Yuki Naito were the defending champions and successfully defended their title after defeating Eri Hozumi and Junri Namigata 6–1, 6–3 in the final.

Seeds

Draw

References
Main Draw

Ando Securities Open - Doubles